Yamuna Expressway is a 6-lane wide (expandable to 8) and 165.5 km long access-controlled expressway in the Indian state of Uttar Pradesh. It is presently India's 6th longest expressway. It was built to de-congest the older Delhi–Agra national highway (NH-2) or Mathura Road.

The expressway having project value  was inaugurated on 9 August 2012 by then Chief Minister of UP Akhilesh Yadav. A total of 13 service roads of about 168 km have been built for local commuters to access the expressway. Yamuna Expressway will be connected with Eastern Peripheral Expressway via an interchange which is being built at Jaganpur Afzalpur village near Noida International University in Gautam Buddh Nagar district.

History
It was conceived with the idea of reducing the travel time between Delhi NCR and Agra. The project was conceived by the Government of Uttar Pradesh in 2001 (led by Rajnath Singh). But the project could not start because of frequent change of Uttar Pradesh state government till 2003 and also it wasn't financially viable back in 2003. The project was reactivated in 2007 when former Chief Minister Mayawati regained power in 2007 state elections and was renamed from Taj Expressway to Yamuna Expressway in 2008.

Yamuna Expressway project was implemented by Jaypee Infratech Limited. In May 2012, Jaypee Group informed state government officials that construction of the expressway had been completed. The Yamuna Expressway was formally inaugurated on 9 August 2012 by Chief Minister Akhilesh Yadav, via video-conference from Lucknow, about two years behind of its original target completion date.

Landing of Fighter jets
In a first for military aviation in India, the Indian Air Force on 21 May 2015 successfully landed a French Dassault Mirage 2000 on the Yamuna Expressway near Raya village, Mathura, at about 6.40 am. The drill was part of more elaborate trials to see how many other highways can be used for emergency landing of defence aircraft. This first ever road landing by the IAF came close to another test landing by two Mirage-2000 aircraft on an airstrip in Akhilesh Yadav's Saifai village in Etawah. The Uttar Pradesh government had given a green signal on 11 May to convert a 3 km stretch of the upcoming Agra-Lucknow Expressway into a full-fledged road runway to the air force. Just as the Saifai landings, the IAF kept the operation secret and only took the authorities concerned on board. The IAF had prohibited all kinds of photography—still or video and deployed its photographers and videographers. The Central Air Command, in a meeting with former UP chief minister Akhilesh Yadav, had made a formal presentation to the state government about converting a 3 km straight stretch of the Agra-Lucknow expressway into India's first road runway.

Salient Features
Some data about the Yamuna Expressway:

 Length - 
 Right of Way - 
 Number of Lanes - 6 lanes (extendable to 8 lanes)
 Type of Pavement - Rigid (Concrete)
 Maximum Axle Load (Design) -  
 Interchange - 7
 Main Toll Plaza - 5
 Toll Plaza on Interchange Loop - 7
 Underpass - 35
 Railway Over Bridge - 1
 Major Bridge - 1
 Minor Bridge - 42
 Cart Track Crossing - 68
 Culverts - N/A
 Vehicular Underpasses - 70
 Maximum Axle Load (Design) -

The Yamuna Expressway has SOS booths along the route besides a toll-free helpline. CCTV cameras are installed every  along the expressway for safety and accident assistance; mobile radars to monitor compliance with minimum and maximum speed limits; and one highway patrol every . The Expressway is expected to be used by over 100,000 vehicles every day, and reduce travel times between Greater Noida and Agra from 4 hours to 1 hour 40 minutes. Petrol pump at the halfway point at Tappal is open. Tappal  from Noida Sec. 37 i.e. botanical garden or Noida city center.

Metro Rail connectivity
Metro connectivity to Yamuna Expressway has got a green signal from the Yamuna Expressway Industrial Development Authority (YEIDA). The metro rail will run from the proposed metro station at Pari Chowk to Yamuna Expressway Sector 18 and 20. These are the 1st inhabited sectors urbanized by the authority and at present are under construction.

Development

The Expressway was developed by Yamuna Expressway Industrial Development Authority (YEIDA) in 3 phases and the contract was awarded to Jaypee Infratech Limited:
 Phase I: Expressway Stretch between Greater Noida & proposed Taj International Aviation Hub (near village Jewar on the southern tip of Dist. Gautam Budh Nagar).
 Phase II: Expressway Stretch between proposed Taj International Aviation Hub and an intermediate destination between proposed Taj International Aviation Hub & Agra.
 Phase III: Expressway Stretch between intermediate destination & Agra.

Speed Limit
The right most lane on the expressway is reserved for overtaking only.

Upcoming Residential Project
Yamuna Expressway has become most preferred for Builders and developers. Many reputed builders are bringing residential projects at Yamuna Expressway. To inject new life into the real estate market, Yamuna Expressway Industrial Development Authority has come up with lucrative affordable housing projects. Under the new subvention scheme YEIDA has launched 200 small ticket size apartments and 80 large size residential flats.

Agra–Lucknow connectivity
A  Agra–Lucknow Expressway Project is completed with estimated budget of  15,000 crore extends YEA to Lucknow enabling fast transit.
Agra–Lucknow Expressway will extend to the proposed Sanjay Khan project of a theme park of seven cities. Yamuna Expressway linked to Agra-Lucknow Expressway through Agra Inner Ring Road Expressway  which also shortens the distance and avoid the heavy traffic of Agra, tourists can directly reach Taj Mahal.

Toll rates
Cars and jeeps will be charged  and mini-buses  as toll. Buses and Trucks will pay . Charges for heavy vehicles will be . A summary table of toll rates is as below:

All figures in Indian Rupees.
 Round trip charges are 1.6 times the one-way toll within 24 hours.
 Special discounts for vehicles using the expressway more than 19 times in a month.

Status updates
 Apr 2001: A 6-lane wide expressway is conceived between Greater Noida and Agra by the then Chief Minister of Uttar Pradesh (Oct 2000-Mar 2002) Rajnath Singh. Taj Expressway Authority (TEA), a statutory body constituted on 20 April 2001.
 Feb 2003: Concession Agreement between TEA and Jaypee Infratech Ltd (Jaypee Group) as the concessionaire was executed on 7 February 2003.
 Sep 2007: Land acquisition began by the Government of UP, led by the then Chief Minister (May 2007-Mar 2012) Mayawati.
 Jan 2008: Construction work started by Jaypee Infratech Ltd. 
 July 2008: Taj Expressway renamed as Yamuna Expressway with effect from 11 July 2008.
 May 2011: Protest started by farmers of Bhatta and Parsaul villages near Dankaur in Gautam Buddha Nagar district. 
 Aug 2012: Yamuna Expressway is inaugurated by the then Chief Minister of Uttar Pradesh (Mar 2012-Mar 2017), Akhilesh Yadav on 9 August 2012.
 Jun 2021: Electronic toll collection has been started on 15 June 2021 by using FASTag RFID on vehicles.

See also
 Eastern Peripheral Expressway (KGP Expressway)
 Western Peripheral Expressway (KMP Expressway)
 Agra–Lucknow Expressway 
 Delhi Noida Direct Flyway (DND Flyway)
 DND–KMP Expressway
 Buddh International Circuit

References 

Transport in Agra
Transport in Gautam Buddh Nagar district
Expressways in Uttar Pradesh
Toll roads in India
Jaypee Group